The 2017 Big Ten Conference Men's Ice Hockey Tournament was the fourth tournament in conference history. It was played between March 16 and March 18, 2017 at Joe Louis Arena in Detroit, Michigan. As tournament champion Penn State was awarded the Big Ten's automatic bid into the 2017 NCAA Division I Men's Ice Hockey Tournament.

Format
All six Big Ten teams participated in the tournament, which was a single-elimination format. Teams were seeded No. 1 through No. 6 according to the final regular season conference standings. In the quarterfinals, No. 3 played No. 6 and No. 4 played No. 5. In the semifinals, No. 2 played the winner of the first game and No. 1 played the winner of the second game (the teams were not reseeded). The two semifinal winners played each other in the Championship Game.

Conference standings
Note: GP = Games played; W = Wins; L = Losses; T = Ties; PTS = Points; GF = Goals For; GA = Goals Against

Bracket

Note: * denotes overtime periods.

Quarterfinals
All times are local (EST) (UTC−4).

(3) Ohio State vs. (6) Michigan State

(4) Penn State vs. (5) Michigan

Semifinals

(2) Wisconsin vs. (3) Ohio State

(1) Minnesota vs. (4) Penn State

Championship

(2) Wisconsin vs. (4) Penn State

Tournament awards

Most Outstanding Player
 Goaltender: Peyton Jones (Penn State)

All-Tournament Team
 Goaltender: Peyton Jones (Penn State)
 Defensemen: Vince Pedrie (Penn State), Erik Autio (Penn State)
 Forwards: Luke Kunin (Wisconsin), Liam Folkes (Penn State), David Gust (Ohio State)

References

External links
 Big Ten Tournament information

Big Ten Men's Ice Hockey Tournament
Big Ten Men's Ice Hockey Tournament